Roches Noires or Assoukhour Assawda is an arrondissement of eastern Casablanca, in the Aïn Sebaâ - Hay Mohammadi district of the Casablanca-Settat region of Morocco. As of 2004 it had 104,310 inhabitants.

A Frenchman named Eugène Lendrat founded the Roches Noires neighborhood and built , a church in Neo-Gothic style replicating an 1860 church by Émile Boeswillwald in Pau, France. The church in Roches Noires was converted into Al-Quds Mosque after Morocco regained its independence.

The French-Moroccan architect Jean-François Zevaco designed the Vincent Timsit Workshop on Blvd. Moulay Ismail in 1952.

References

Arrondissements of Casablanca
Neighbourhoods of Casablanca